Alvin Lynn Garrett (born October 1, 1956) is a former American football wide receiver in the National Football League (NFL) for the New York Giants and the Washington Redskins.

College career

Before his NFL career, he played college football at Angelo State University, leading the team in receiving in 1977 and 1978.  In 1978, the team went 14-0 and won the NAIA Football National Championship, an experience Garrett called his best memory as a football player.  Garett finished his two college seasons with 40 receptions for 839 yards and six touchdowns.

Professional career
Garrett was drafted in the 9th round of the 1979 NFL draft by the New York Giants.  He played with them until November 1981, when he was cut near the end of the season and signed with Washington.

Garrett is best known for replacing injured starter Art Monk in the 1982 NFL playoffs.  Although he only caught one pass during the regular season, he caught 13 passes for 231 yards and four touchdowns in Washington's three playoff games.  Then in Washington's 27-17 win in Super Bowl XVII, he caught two passes for 13 yards and another touchdown.  He also ripped off a 44-yard run on a reverse play during the third quarter, setting a field goal by kicker Mark Moseley.  At the time, it was the longest run by a receiver in Super Bowl history.

His best season came in 1983 with the Redskins when he played in fifteen games, catching 25 receptions for 332 yards and one touchdown.  He went on to catch a pass for 17 yards and gain 100 yards returning kickoffs in Super Bowl XVIII.

He finished his five-season NFL career with 32 receptions for 412 yards and two touchdowns, 43 punt returns for 334 yards, and 50 kickoff returns for 1,013 yards in 55 games.

The Cosell incident
During the first half of the September 5, 1983 Monday Night Football game between the Dallas Cowboys and Washington Redskins, Howard Cosell's commentary on Garrett included "That little monkey gets loose doesn't he?"  Cosell's references to Garrett as a "little monkey," ignited a racial controversy that laid the groundwork for Cosell's departure from MNF at the end of the 1983 season. The Rev. Joseph Lowery, then-president of the Southern Christian Leadership Conference, denounced Cosell's comment as racist and demanded a public apology.  Despite supportive statements by Jesse Jackson, Muhammad Ali, and Alvin Garrett himself, the fallout contributed to Cosell's decision to leave Monday Night Football following the 1983 season.

"I liked Howard Cosell," Garrett said. "I didn't feel that it was a demeaning statement."

Cosell explained that Garrett's small stature, and not his race, was the basis for his comment, citing the fact that he had used the term to describe his own grandchildren.

Among other evidence to support Cosell's claim is video footage of a 1972 preseason game between the New York Giants and the Kansas City Chiefs that features Cosell referring to athlete Mike Adamle, a 5-foot, 8-inch, 195-pound Caucasian, as a "little monkey."

References

External links
http://www.pro-football-reference.com/players/GarrAl00.htm
https://web.archive.org/web/20070929211824/http://www.databasefootball.com/players/playerpage.htm?ilkid=GARREALV01
http://howardcosell-littlemonkeycomment.blogspot.com/

1956 births
Living people
American football wide receivers
Angelo State Rams football players
New York Giants players
Washington Redskins players